

Regular season

Schedule

Player stats

Skaters

Goaltenders

Awards and honors
Noemie Marin, Top 10 Finalist, 2006 Patty Kazmaier Award
Riitta Schaublin, Top 3 Finalist, 2006 Patty Kazmaier Award

References

Minnesota-Duluth Bulldogs
Minnesota Duluth Bulldogs women's ice hockey seasons